Dobravšce is a small dispersed settlement south of Gorenja Vas in the Municipality of Gorenja Vas–Poljane in the Upper Carniola region of Slovenia.

References

External links 

Dobravšce on Geopedia

Populated places in the Municipality of Gorenja vas-Poljane